The first series of BBC family sitcom My Family originally aired between 19 September and 7 November 2000. The first episode of the series, and the pilot episode, is entitled "The Serpent's Tooth". All eight episodes in the first series are thirty minutes long. The first episode introduces the five main characters that regularly appear in the series: Robert Lindsay, who plays Ben, Zoë Wanamaker, who plays Susan, Kris Marshall, who plays Nick, Daniela Denby-Ashe, who plays Janey, and Gabriel Thomson, who plays Michael. A further regular member of the cast is Brigitte, played by Daisy Donovan, who appears in nearly every episode of the series. The series was produced by Rude Boy Productions, a company that produces comedies created by Fred Barron. The series was filmed at Pinewood Studios in Buckinghamshire, with a live studio audience.

Episode information

Reception

Viewers
The series was given a mid-week time slot, originally airing on Tuesdays at 8:30pm. The series became an immediate hit with viewers, with the first episode gaining 8.48 million viewers, the sixth highest rating for the week. Ratings began to fall for the next three episodes, to a point where ratings for the fourth episode of the series failed to appear in the BBC's Top 30 programmes. However, when the series was moved to a prime-time slot on Friday evenings, beginning with Episode 5, ratings began to improve, with the seventh episode of the series reaching 8.38 million viewers. The first series averaged 7.04 million viewers for each episode.

Critics
The series was openly criticised for its American roots, with the use of quick one-line jokes, compared to the more traditional built-up jokes of other British sitcoms.

References

External links
My Family: Series One at the British Comedy Guide
My Family: Series One at My Family Online
 BBC Comedy- My Family Series 1

2000 British television seasons